Baha Cemal Zağra (1894, Stara Zagora - 29 July 1976) was a Turkish politician.

Life and career 
He was a high school graduate. He served as the Chairman of the Board of Directors of the Bursa Chamber of Commerce and Industry, a Member and the 2nd Chairman of the Provincial Assembly, the Deputy Chairman of the Municipal Assembly, the 10th and 1st (12) Term Bursa Deputy of the Grand National Assembly of Turkey. He was married and had three children.

References 

1894 births
1976 deaths
Turkish politicians
Members of the 10th Parliament of Turkey
Members of the 12th Parliament of Turkey